Roche Creek is a locality in the Western Downs Region, Queensland, Australia.

Geography 
The locality presumably takes its name from the creek, which rises in the south-east of the locality and flows through the locality exiting to the north-west (Grosmont) where it becomes a tributary of the Juandah Creek.

History 
Roche Creek Provisional School opened in 1914 and closed circa 1917.

References 

Western Downs Region
Localities in Queensland